Jarrah Al-Asmawi (born 19 August 1970) is a Kuwaiti swimmer. He competed in the 1992 Summer Olympics.

References

1970 births
Living people
Swimmers at the 1992 Summer Olympics
Kuwaiti male swimmers
Olympic swimmers of Kuwait